The 1951–52 season was Newport County's fifth consecutive season in the Third Division South since relegation from the Second Division at the end of the 1946–47 season. It was the club's 23rd season in the third tier and 24th season overall in the Football League.

Season review

Results summary

Results by round

Fixtures and results

Third Division South

* Ambrosen incorrectly records the Shrewsbury Town away match with same scoreline and attendance as the home match

FA Cup

Welsh Cup

League table

External links
 Newport County 1951-1952 : Results
 Newport County football club match record: 1952
 Welsh Cup 1951/52

References

 Amber in the Blood: A History of Newport County. 

1951-52
English football clubs 1951–52 season
1951–52 in Welsh football